Garmugia, also referred to as gramugia, is a soup in Italian cuisine that originated in Lucca, Tuscany, central Italy. The soup's use in the cuisine of Lucca  dates back to the 17th century. Garmugia has been described as "a hearty soup" that is "unknown outside of the province" in Italy.

Ingredients
Primary ingredients include chicken or vegetable stock or broth, asparagus, artichoke hearts, fava beans, peas, onion and meats, such as pancetta and veal. Carrot, celery and beet leaves may also be used. The pancetta and veal may be used in relatively small portions, to add flavor to the soup. Some versions may be prepared using lean ground beef, beefsteak or sausage, and some may include cheese such as Parmesan or Pecorino. Seasonings may include salt and pepper. It may be served poured atop toasted bread or croutons.

Preparation
Garmugia may be prepared seasonally, when its primary vegetable ingredients are harvested in the spring. The soup may be cooked in an earthenware vessel. Total cooking times can vary between approximately 30 minutes to over 2 hours.

See also

 List of Italian soups
 List of soups

References

Further reading
 

Cuisine of Tuscany
Italian soups